Julie Lescaut is a French police television series. It was broadcast from 1992 to 2014 on TF1 (France), La Une-RTBF (Belgium) and TSR (Switzerland). It details the investigations of Police Superintendent Julie Lescaut (played by Véronique Genest) and her team. The show is aired in various other languages, including German, Catalan, Persian, Polish, Slovak, Czech and Japanese (the only subtitled version.)

Recurring characters

Main characters
Véronique Genest: Police Superintendent Julie Lescaut
Jennifer Lauret: Sarah, Julie's daughter
Alexis Desseaux: Detective Motta

Secondary
Joséphine Serre: Babou, Julie's daughter (until 2004, and last episode)
Mouss Diouf: Detective Justin N'Guma
Renaud Marx: Detective David Kaplan (until 2005)
Jérôme Anger: Detective Trémois (until 1995)
Jean-Paul Rouve: Corporal Leveil (until 1998)
Eriq Ebouaney: Rémi Mertens (2009–11)
François Marthouret: Paul Lescaut (1993-2000)
François Dunoyer: Julie's new partner
Claude Brécourt: Prosecutor
Jean-Paul Comart: Santi/Delerme
Nadège Beausson-Diagne
Mareva Galanter

Guest

Agnès Soral
Alexis Michalik
Claude Jade
Albert Delpy
Alice Pol
Andrée Damant
Anne Canovas
Anne Charrier
Anne Le Ny
Arthur Dupont
Audrey Tautou
Aurélien Recoing
Bernard Verley
Bruno Todeschini
Carole Franck
Catherine Hiegel
Catherine Wilkening
Claire Nebout
Delphine Chanéac
Denis Ménochet
Didier Flamand
Élisabeth Margoni
Elizabeth Bourgine
Émilie Caen
Eric Godon
Éric Prat
François Berléand
François Levantal
Frédérique Cantrel
Georges Corraface
Gianni Giardinelli
Guillaume Delorme
Hugo Becker
Isabelle Candelier
Jacques Boudet
Jean Benguigui
Jean Dell
Jean-Marie Winling
Judith El Zein
Julien Courbey
Laurent Lafitte
Marianne Denicourt
Mata Gabin
Michèle Moretti
Myriam Boyer
Natacha Amal
Nathalie Boutefeu
Nicolas Marié
Pascal Elso
Pascale Arbillot
Philippe Bas
Rufus
Samir Guesmi
Sophie Mounicot
Steve Tran
Thibault de Montalembert
Thierry Godard
Thomas Chabrol
Valérie Vogt
Vincent Grass
Zinedine Soualem

Directors
 Alain Wermus (14 Episodes)
 Josée Dayan (7 Episodes)
 Élisabeth Rappeneau (4 Episodes)
 Caroline Huppert (3 Episodes)
 Charlotte Brandström (2 Episodes)

See also
 List of French television series

External links
 Show summary

1992 French television series debuts
French police procedural television series
TF1 original programming
2014 French television series endings